The Keio Challenger is a professional tennis tournament played on hardcourts. It is currently part of the ATP Challenger Tour and the ITF Women's Circuit. Having been held in Yokohama, Japan since 1999, the women's edition of the event was introduced in 2017.

Past finals

Men's singles

Men's doubles

Women's singles

Women's doubles

External links
 Official website

 
ATP Challenger Tour
ITF Women's World Tennis Tour
Hard court tennis tournaments
Recurring sporting events established in 1999
Tennis tournaments in Japan
Sport in Yokohama